In algebra and number theory, Euclid's lemma is a lemma that captures a fundamental property of prime numbers, namely:

In fact, .

If the premise of the lemma does not hold, i.e.,  is a composite number, its consequent may be either true or false.

This property is the key in the proof of the fundamental theorem of arithmetic. It is used to define prime elements, a generalization of prime numbers to arbitrary commutative rings. Euclid's Lemma shows that in the integers irreducible elements are also prime elements. The proof uses induction so it does not apply to all integral domains.

Formulations
Euclid's lemma is commonly used in the following equivalent form:

Euclid's lemma can be generalized as follows from prime numbers to any integers.

This is a generalization because a prime number  is coprime with an integer  if and only if  does not divide .

History
The lemma first appears as proposition 30 in Book VII of Euclid's Elements. It is included in practically every book that covers elementary number theory.

The generalization of the lemma to integers appeared in Jean Prestet's textbook Nouveaux Elémens de Mathématiques in 1681.

In Carl Friedrich Gauss's treatise Disquisitiones Arithmeticae, the statement of the lemma is Euclid's Proposition 14 (Section 2), which he uses to prove the uniqueness of the decomposition product of prime factors of an integer (Theorem 16), admitting the existence as "obvious". From this existence and uniqueness he then deduces the generalization of prime numbers to integers. For this reason, the generalization of Euclid's lemma is sometimes referred to as Gauss's lemma, but some believe this usage is incorrect due to confusion with Gauss's lemma on quadratic residues.

Proofs
The two first subsections, are proofs of the generalized version of Euclid's lemma, namely that: if  divides  and is coprime with  then it divides .

The original Euclid's lemma follows immediately, since, if  is prime then it divides  or does not divide  in which case it is coprime with  so per the generalized version it divides .

Using Bézout's identity
In modern mathematics, a common proof involves Bézout's identity, which was unknown at Euclid's time.

Let  and  be coprime, and assume that .

Multiply both sides by :

By induction
The following proof is inspired by Euclid's version of Euclidean algorithm, which proceeds by using only subtractions.

One has to prove that  divides .

There are three cases:

If , coprimality implies , and  divides  trivially.

If , one has

It results that , by the coprimality hypothesis. So, the conclusion follows from the induction hypothesis, since .

Similarly, if  one has

Therefore, one has , and the induction hypothesis implies that  divides ; that is,  for some integer.

Proof of Elements 
Euclid's lemma is proved at the Proposition 30 in Book VII of Euclid's Elements.

Proposition 19
If four numbers be proportional, the number produced from the first and fourth is equal to the number produced from the second and third; and, if the number produced from the first and fourth be equal to that produced from the second and third, the four numbers are proportional.
Proposition 20
The least numbers of those that have the same ratio with them measures those that have the same ratio the same number of times—the greater the greater and the less the less.
Proposition 21
Numbers prime to one another are the least of those that have the same ratio with them.
Proposition 29
Any prime number is prime to any number it does not measure.
Proposition 30
If two numbers, by multiplying one another, make the same number, and any prime number measures the product, it also measures one of the original numbers.
Proof of 30
If c, a prime number, measure ab, c measures either a or b.Suppose c does not measure a.Therefore c, a are prime to one another. ［VII. 29］Suppose ab＝mc.Therefore c : a ＝ b : m. ［VII. 19］Hence ［VII. 20, 21］ b＝nc, where n is some integer.Therefore c measures b.Similarly, if c does not measure b, c measures a.Therefore c measures one or other of the two numbers a, b.Q.E.D.

See also

Bézout's identity
Euclidean algorithm
Fundamental theorem of arithmetic
Irreducible element
Prime element
Prime number

Footnotes

Notes

Citations

References
.
- vol. 2

.

.
.

External links

Articles containing proofs
Lemmas in number theory
Theorems about prime numbers